Feuerschaugemeinde is a special-purpose municipality for firefighting, energy and water for the town Appenzell, capital of the canton of Appenzell Innerrhoden in Switzerland. The special-purpose municipality exists because parts of the town Appenzell belong to the districts Appenzell, Schwende and Rüte.

Geography of Appenzell Innerrhoden
Appenzell (village)